This page lists board and card games, wargames, miniatures games, and tabletop role-playing games published in 2002.  For video games, see 2002 in video gaming.

Games released or invented in 2002

Game awards given in 2002
 Spiel des Jahres: Villa Paletti
 Games: DVONN

Significant games-related events of 2002
Paizo Publishing founded.

Death

See also
 2002 in video gaming

Games
Games by year